Wiek is a municipality in the Vorpommern-Rügen district, in Mecklenburg-Vorpommern, Germany.

The body of the well-known American Brigadier General Nathan Bedford Forrest III, killed while on an air raid on Kiel in 1943, was buried at Wiek by the German authorities. It laid there until 1947 when the body was repatriated to the United States.

References

External links

 
Wiek at ruegen.de 

Towns and villages on Rügen
Wittow